This list of mammals of South Dakota includes species native to the U.S. state of South Dakota. Three species that are extirpated from the state are the mountain goat, gray wolf, and grizzly bear. The state consists of 86 species that live and formerly inhabited South Dakota.

Order Didelphimorphia

Didelphidae
Virginia opossum, Didelphis virginiana

Order Eulipotyphla

Soricidae (shrews)

Northern short-tailed shrew, Blarina brevicauda
Least shrew, Cryptotis parva
Arctic shrew, Sorex arcticus
Masked shrew, Sorex cinereus
American pygmy shrew, Sorex hoyi possibly extirpated
Dwarf shrew, Sorex nanus
American water shrew, Sorex palustris

Talpidae (moles)
Eastern mole, Scalopus aquaticus

Order Chiroptera

Vespertilionidae

Big brown bat, Eptesicus fuscus
Eastern red bat, Lasiurus borealis
Hoary bat, Lasiurus cinereus
Silver-haired bat, Lasionycteris noctivagans
Keen's myotis, Myotis keenii
Fringe-tailed bat, Myotis thysanodes
Little brown bat, Myotis lucifugus
Townsend's big-eared bat, Plecotus townsendii

Order Carnivora

Canidae

Coyote, Canis latrans
Gray wolf, Canis lupus extirpated
Northern Rocky Mountain wolf, C. l. irremotus extirpated
Great Plains wolf, C. l. nubilus 
Gray fox, Urocyon cineroeargenteus
Swift fox, Vulpes velox
Red fox, Vulpes vulpes

Felidae
Bobcat, Lynx rufus
Cougar, Puma concolor

Procyonidae
Raccoon, Procyon lotor

Mephitidae
Striped skunk, Mephitis mephitis
Eastern spotted skunk, Spilogale putorius

Mustelidae
North American river otter, Lontra canadensis
Black-footed ferret, Mustela nigripes reintroduced
Least weasel, Mustela nivalis
Long-tailed weasel, Neogale frenata
American mink, Neogale vison
American badger, Taxidea taxus

Ursidae
American black bear, Ursus americanus
Brown bear, Ursus arctos extirpated
Grizzly bear, U. a. horribilis extirpated

Order Artiodactyla

Cervidae
Moose, Alces alces vagrant
Elk, Cervus canadensis
Mule deer, Odocoileus hemionus
White-tailed deer, Odocoileus virginianus

Antilocapridae
Pronghorn, Antilocapra americana

Bovidae
American bison, Bison bison reintroduced
Plains bison, B. b. bison reintroduced
Bighorn sheep, Ovis canadensis
Mountain goat, Oreamnos americanus introduced

Order Lagomorpha

Leporidae

Black-tailed jackrabbit, Lepus californicus
White-tailed jackrabbit, Lepus townsendii
Desert cottontail, Sylvilagus audubonii
Eastern cottontail, Sylvilagus floridanus
Mountain cottontail, Sylvilagus nuttalii

Order Rodentia

Castoridae
American beaver, Castor canadensis

Cricetidae
Southern red-backed vole, Clethrionomys gapperi
Sagebrush vole, Lemmiscus curtatus
Long-tailed vole, Microtus longicaudus
Prairie vole, Microtus ochrogaster
Western meadow vole, Microtus drummondii
Bushy-tailed woodrat, Neotoma cinerea
Muskrat, Ondatra zibethicus
Northern grasshopper mouse, Onychomys leucogaster
White-footed mouse, Peromyscus leucopus
Western deer mouse, Peromyscus sonoriensis
Western harvest mouse, Reithrodontomys megalotis
Plains harvest mouse, Reithrodontomys montanus

Erethizontidae
North American porcupine, Erethizon dorsatum

Geomyidae
Plains pocket gopher, Geomys bursarius
Northern pocket gopher, Thomomys talpoides

Heteromyidae
Hispid pocket mouse, Chaetodipus hispidus
Ord's kangaroo rat, Dipodomys ordii
Olive-backed pocket mouse, Perognathus fasciatus
Plains pocket mouse, Perognathus flavescens

Muridae
House mouse, Mus musculus introduced
Norway rat, Rattus norvegicus introduced

Sciuridae
Least chipmunk, Eutamias minimus
Black-tailed prairie dog, Cynomys ludovicianus
Southern flying squirrel, Glaucomys volans
Northern flying squirrel, Glaucomys sabrinus
Yellow-bellied marmot, Marmota flaviventris
Groundhog, Marmota monax
Fox squirrel, Sciurus niger
Franklin's ground squirrel, Spermophilus frankinii
Richardson's ground squirrel, Spermophilus richardsonii
Spotted ground squirrel, Spermophilus spilosoma
Thirteen-lined ground squirrel, Spermophilus tridecemlineatus
Eastern chipmunk, Tamias striatus
American red squirrel, Tamiasciurus hudsonicus

Zapodidae
Meadow jumping mouse, Zapus hudsonius
Western jumping mouse, Zapus princeps

See also
List of prehistoric mammals
Lists of mammals by region
Mammal classification

References

External links
Wildlife viewing, Animal and Bird watching
Checklist of Wild Mammals of South Dakota

South Dakota
Mammals